The Urmi is a river in Khabarovsk Krai of Russia.

The Urmi merges with the Kur to form the Tunguska, which then falls into the Amur opposite Khabarovsk.

The Urmi's source lies on the southern slopes of the Badzhal Range, from where it begins to flow adjacent to the Bureia Range. The river's lower course passes mostly through the Amur Lowland.

The Urmi depends on rain for most of its water. With the onset of winter in November, the river freezes.

The river is navigable by small craft.

See also
List of rivers of Russia

References

Rivers of Khabarovsk Krai